Golaem Crowd is a plug-in for Autodesk Maya that allows for the simulation of controllable characters crowds based on independent agents. It is developed by Golaem, a France-based software company (created in Rennes in 2009).

It is a tool to generate characters in reachable areas of the scene (e.g. to place an army in a field avoiding trees and rocks)
While animators can use Maya tools to make the crowd characters (represented as particle) move in the scene, the plugin provides navigation behaviours to make them go from A to B autonomously. It allows for automatic navigation mesh computation, Roadmap-based path planning
and configurable steering behaviours (including reactive collision avoidance).

The included animation engine enables to replay previously created motion, even on characters of different morphologies. Golaem Crowd can adapt motions to the ground and automatically compute transitions between motions, for two-legged or four-legged motion. It provides: Automatic and editable skeleton mapping, biped & quadruped dedicated animation engine, automatic motion retargeting, blending & ground adaptation. Animations can be triggered and blended by defining associated behaviours with start/stop trigger conditions.
 
The user interface is based on Maya workaday objects (particles, fields…). Golaem Crowd is based on the standard animation workflow in CGI, and allows users to incrementally build a scene. Steps are validated one by one: assets, flows, population; behaviours; animation.

History
 The first public version of the software was presented and released in May 2011 at the 16th annual FMX conference in Stuttgart.
 V1.1 was released in June 2011 with the added support of 3Delight.
 During SIGGRAPH 2011, Golaem and the Academy award-winning post-production studio  Mikros Images released Golaem Project a humorous short film showcasing Golaem Crowd capabilities.
 V1.2 was released in September 2011, it was the first version supporting Chaos Group's V-Ray rendering engine and using Disney's Partio particle cache.
 V1.3 was released in November 2011, this versions included new characters behaviors relying on IK. At the same time, the new pricing was announced, as well as the official Golaem Crowd blog.
 V1.5 was released in July 2012.
 V2.0 was released in August 2012, this version introduced a graphical behavior editor, as well as Ragdoll physics and formations.
 V2.2 was released in January 2013, added support for Solid Angle's Arnold rendering engine.
 V3.0 was released in December 2013, added n-peds support, flocks behaviors and a new previsualization.
 V3.1 was released in February 2014, added visual debug and Arnold mtoa 1.x compatibility.
 V4.0 was released in March 2015, added timeline scrubbing, cache editing, cloth simulation, squash & stretch, alembic support…

In production
Some examples where Golaem Crowd was used in production includes:
ALÉSIA, le rêve d'un roi nu, ⁣ by Mikros Image (post-production)
Once Upon a Time, ⁣ by Zoic Studios
Nissan Juke commercial, ⁣ by Mikros Image (post-production)
Orange Sport Be Prepared commercial, ⁣ by Mikros Image (post-production)
Asterix and Obelix: God Save Britannia, ⁣ by Mikros Image (post-production)
Warm Bodies, ⁣ by Look Effects
Nike 'Dare to be Brazilian' commercial,  by Framestore
Game of Thrones, ⁣ by Pixomondo
Der Medicus, ⁣ by Pixomondo
Sky Sports 'Making Sports Better', ⁣ by Framestore
Hercules, ⁣ by Milk VFX and Cinesite
Dracula Untold, ⁣ by Framestore and Milk VFX
Dawn of the Planet of the Zombies and the Giant Killer Planets on Some Serious Acid, a short film by Alf Lovvold
Woodlawn, ⁣ by Red Sky Studios
Guitar Hero Live, ⁣ by Framestore and FreeStyleGames
Norm of the North
Pirates of the Caribbean: Dead Men Tell No Tales

Compatible renderers
Pixar's RenderMan
Chaos Group's V-Ray
Guerilla Render
Solid Angle’s Arnold
Mental Ray
3delight
Redshift

See also
Crowd simulation
List of Maya plugins

References

3D graphics software
Animation software
Agent-based model
2011 software
Cinematic techniques
Visual effects software
3D computer graphics software for Linux
Proprietary commercial software for Linux